The following outline is provided as an overview of and topical guide to Munich:

Munich – capital and the most populated city in the German state of Bavaria. With over 1,450,000 residents in 310.43 km2 (119.86 sq mi) it is also Germany's third most populated Großstadt. Munich is considered a global city , one of the most prosperous and fastest growing cities in Germany.

General reference 
 Pronunciation:  ;  ;  
 Common English name(s): Munich
 Official English name(s): Munich
 Adjectival(s): Münchner
 Demonym(s): Münchner

Geography of Munich 

Geography of Munich
 Munich is:
 a city
 capital of Bavaria
 Population of Munich: 1,450,381
 Area of Munich: 310.43 km2 (119.86 sq mi) 
 Atlas of Munich

Location of Munich 
 Munich is situated within the following regions:
 Northern Hemisphere and Eastern Hemisphere
 Eurasia
 Europe (outline)
 Central Europe
 Germany
 Bavaria
 Upper Bavaria
 Munich Metropolitan Region
 Time zone(s): Central European Time (UTC+01), Central European Summer Time (UTC+02)

Environment of Munich 

 Climate of Munich

Natural geographic features of Munich 

 Hills in Munich
 Luitpoldhügel
 Lakes in Munich
 Nadisee
 Rivers in Munich
 Isar
Eisbach
 Würm

Areas of Munich 

Munich Metropolitan Region
 Larger Urban Zone
 Stadt München
 Landkreis Dachau 
 Landkreis Ebersberg 
 Landkreis Erding 
 Landkreis Freising 
 Landkreis Fürstenfeldbruck 
 Landkreis Landsberg am Lech 
 Landkreis München 
 Landkreis Starnberg

Boroughs of Munich

Locations in Munich 

 Tourist attractions in Munich
 Kunstareal
 Shopping areas and markets

City gates of Munich 

 Isartor
 Karlstor
 Propylaea
 Sendlinger Tor

Cultural and exhibition centres in Munich 

 Alte Kongresshalle
 Gasteig
 Neue Messe München

Fountains in Munich 
 Fischbrunnen
 Neptunbrunnen

Monuments and memorials in Munich 
 Angel of Peace
 Ruhmeshalle
 Bavaria statue

Museums and galleries in Munich 

Museums in Munich

 Alte Pinakothek
 Bavarian National Museum
 Bavarian State Archaeological Collection
 BMW Museum
 BMW Welt
 Deutsches Museum
 Deutsches Theatermuseum
 Glyptothek
 Haus der Kunst
 Lenbachhaus
 Marstallmuseum
 Munich Stadtmuseum
 Museum Brandhorst
 Museum Five Continents
 Museum für Abgüsse Klassischer Bildwerke
 Museum Reich der Kristalle
 MVG Museum
 Neue Pinakothek
 Palaeontological Museum
 Pinakothek der Moderne
 Schackgalerie
 Staatliche Antikensammlungen
 Staatliche Graphische Sammlung München
 Staatliche Sammlung für Ägyptische Kunst

Palaces and villas in Munich 

 Alter Hof
 Amalienburg
 Blutenburg Castle
 Fürstenried Palace
 Holnstein Palace
 Munich Residenz
 Nymphenburg Palace
 Palais Leuchtenberg
 Palais Ludwig Ferdinand
 Palais Porcia
 Palais Preysing
 Prinz-Carl-Palais
 Schleissheim Palace
 Villa Stuck
 Villenkolonie Pasing I
 Wittelsbacher Palais

Parks and gardens in Munich 

 Alter Botanischer Garten
 Botanischer Garten München-Nymphenburg
 Englischer Garten
 Hellabrunn Zoo
 Hofgarten
 Olympiapark
 Olympiahalle
 Olympiaturm
 Olympic Village
 Ostpark
 Westpark
 Zamilapark

Public squares and open spaces in Munich 

 Karlsplatz
 Königsplatz
 Mariahilfplatz
 Marienplatz
 Max-Joseph-Platz
 Münchner Freiheit
 Odeonsplatz
 Panzerwiese
 Theresienwiese

Religious buildings in Munich 

 Abbey Church of St Anna
 Allerheiligen-Hofkirche
 Asam Church
 Ludwigskirche
 Munich Frauenkirche, the cathedral
 New St John's Church
 Salvatorkirche
 St. Boniface's Abbey
 St. Luke's Church
 St. Martin, Moosach
 St. Michael in Berg am Laim
 St. Michael's Church
 St. Paul's Church
 St. Peter's Church
 St. Peter, Großhadern
 St. Sylvester, Schwabing
 Theatine Church
 Trinity Church

Secular buildings in Munich 

 Bavarian State Library
 Bayerische Staatskanzlei
 BMW Headquarters
 Circus Krone Building
 Hypo-Haus
 Justizpalast
 Maximilianeum
 New Town Hall
 Rathaus-Glockenspiel
 Old Technical Town Hall
 Old Town Hall
 SiemensForum München
 SV-Hochhaus

Streets in Munich 

Streets in Munich
 Alte Allee
 Brienner Straße
 Hohenzollernstraße
 Leopoldstraße
 Ludwigstraße
 Maximilianstraße
 Prinzregentenstraße
 Sendlinger Straße
 Sonnenstraße
 Tal

Theatres in Munich 

Theatres in Munich
 Cuvilliés Theatre
 Deutsches Theater
 Münchner Marionettentheater
 National Theatre Munich
 Prinzregententheater
 Residenz Theatre
 Staatstheater am Gärtnerplatz

Triumphal arches in Munich 
 Siegestor

Demographics of Munich 

Demographics of Munich
 Population growth of Munich

Government and politics of Munich 

Administration of Munich
 Landtag of Bavaria
 Mayor of Munich

Law and order in Munich 
 Bavarian State Police
 Bavarian Border Police
 Polizeipräsidium München

Military in Munich

History of Munich 

History of Munich

History of Munich, by period or event 

Timeline of Munich
 Founding of Munich (1158)
 Munich during the Middle Ages
 Duchy of Bavaria (from the 6th through the 8th century)
 Capital of the reunited duchy of Bavaria – Munich becomes capital of the whole of Bavaria (1506)
 Kingdom of Bavaria (1805–1918)
 Capital of the Kingdom of Bavaria – Munich becomes the capital of the new Kingdom of Bavaria (1806)
 Munich during World War I
 Munich during the Weimar Republic, the Nazi Regime, and the World War II
 Beer Hall Putsch (8–9 November 1923)
 Munich Agreement (1938)
Lesson of Munich
 Bombing of Munich in World War II (in the later stages of World War II)
 Munich today (1945–present)

History of Munich, by subject 
 History of the Jews in Munich

Culture of Munich

Arts in Munich

Architecture of Munich 
Architecture of Munich

 Art Nouveau architecture in Munich
 Hofatelier Elvira
 Baroque architecture in Munich
Bürgersaalkirche
Nymphenburg Palace
 Gothic Revival architecture in Munich
 Munich Stadtmuseum
 New Town Hall
 St Paul's Church
 Modern architecture in Munich
 BMW Welt
 Highlight Towers
 Hochhaus Uptown München
 SV-Hochhaus 
 Neoclassical architecture in Munich
 Glyptothek
 Prinz-Carl-Palais
 Staatliche Antikensammlungen
 Neo-Renaissance architecture in Munich
 Academy of Fine Arts
 Renaissance architecture in Munich
 Munich Residenz
 Old Academy
 Rococo architecture in Munich
 Cuvilliés Theatre
 Holnstein Palace

Cinema of Munich 
 Bavaria Film
 Constantin Film
 Munich Film Museum

Music of Munich 

Music of Munich
 Bavarian Radio Symphony Orchestra
 Bavarian State Opera
 Bavarian State Orchestra
 Bayerisches Staatsballett
 Münchener Bach-Chor
 MünchenKlang
 Munich Chamber Orchestra
 Munich Philharmonic
 Munich Radio Orchestra
 Munich Symphony Orchestra
 Philharmonischer Chor München

Theatre of Munich 
Munich Kammerspiele

Visual arts of Munich 

 

 Munich School
 Munich Secession

Bavarian traditional clothing
 Tracht
 Bavarian hat
 Gamsbart
 Dirndl
 Haferlschuh
 Lederhosen

Cuisine of Munich
 Culinary specialities

Events in Munich
 Christkindlmarkt at Marienplatz
 Electronica
 International Garden Expo 83
 Internationale Fachmesse für Sportartikel und Sportmode
 Kunstmesse München
 Mineralientage München
 Munich Biennale
 Munich Opera Festival
 Munich Science Days
 Oktoberfest
 Streetlife Festival
Languages of Munich
 Bavarian language

Media in Munich
 Newspapers in Munich
Abendzeitung
Münchner Merkur
Süddeutsche Zeitung
Tz (newspaper)
 Radio and television in Munich
 Bayerischer Rundfunk

People from Munich
 List of honorary citizens of Munich

Religion in Munich 

Religion in Munich

 Catholicism in Munich
Roman Catholic Archdiocese of Munich
 Munich Frauenkirche
 Freising Cathedral

 Protestantism in Munich
 Protestantism in Munich 
 St Luke's Church

 Islam in Munich
 Mosque in Sendling

Sports in Munich 

Sport in Munich
 Basketball in Munich
 FC Bayern Munich (basketball)
 Football in Munich
 FC Bayern Munich
List of FC Bayern Munich players
 TSV 1860 Munich
 Munich derby
 Rugby football in Munich
 München RFC 
 Ice hockey in Munich
 EHC Red Bull München
 Olympics in Munich
 1972 Summer Olympics
 Running in Munich
 Munich Marathon
 Sports venues in Munich
 Allianz Arena
 Grünwalder Stadion
 Olympia Eishalle
 Olympia Schwimmhalle
 Olympiastadion
 Radstadion
 Rudi-Sedlmayer-Halle

Economy and infrastructure of Munich 

Economy of Munich

 Automotive industry in Munich
 BMW
 BMW Headquarters
 BMW vehicles
 MAN SE
 Electronics industry in Munich
 Rohde & Schwarz
 Siemens
 Financial services in Munich
 Munich's financial community
Allianz
Börse München
HypoVereinsbank
 Hotels in Munich
 Hotel Bayerischer Hof
 Hotel Königshof
 Hotel Vier Jahreszeiten
 Mandarin Oriental
 Sheraton Munich Arabellapark Hotel
 The Charles Hotel
 Restaurants and cafés in Munich
 Café-Bistro Dallmayr
 Hirschgarten
 Hofbräuhaus am Platzl
 Wienerwald
  Shopping malls and markets in Munich
 Hofstatt
 Karstadt München Bahnhofplatz
 Olympia-Einkaufszentrum
 Pasing Arcaden
 Riem Arcaden
 Weekly Markets in Munich
Wholesale Market Munich

Transportation in Munich 

Public transport in Munich
 Public transport operators 
Münchner Verkehrs- und Tarifverbund (MVV) 
Air transport in Munich 
 Airports in Munich
Munich Airport

Rail transport in Munich 
  Munich S-Bahn
  Munich U-Bahn
 List of Munich U-Bahn stations
 München Hauptbahnhof
  Trams in Munich

Road transport in Munich 

 Bus transport in Munich
 Zentraler Omnibusbahnhof München
 Car sharing in Munich
 DriveNow 
 Cycling in Munich
 Call a Bike
 Roads in Munich
Outer Ring

Education in Munich 

Education in Munich
 Academy of Fine Arts
 Bundeswehr University Munich
 Hochschule für Musik und Theater München
 Ludwig Maximilian University of Munich
 Munich Business School
 Munich School of Philosophy
 Munich University of Applied Sciences
 Technical University of Munich
 University of Television and Film Munich
Research institutes in Munich
 European Southern Observatory
 Ifo Institute for Economic Research
 Max Planck Institute for Astrophysics

Healthcare in Munich 

Hospitals in Munich
 Klinikum Großhadern
 Rechts der Isar Hospital

See also 

 Outline of geography

References

External links 

Munich
Munich